Wyndham Lake Buena Vista Disney Springs Resort Area is a 394-room resort situated on the property of Walt Disney World in Lake Buena Vista, Florida. It is located at 1850 Hotel Plaza Blvd., across from the Disney Springs area.

The hotel opened on October 15, 1972, as the Dutch Inn, the 3rd hotel to open on Walt Disney World property, located on Hotel Plaza Boulevard. It was later sold to Fort Worth-based Americana Hotels and rebranded as Americana's Dutch Resort Hotel, later slightly modified to the Americana Dutch Resort Hotel. Americana Hotels sold the resort to Grosvenor Properties in August 1986 for $33 million, and the hotel became the Grosvenor Resort. In 1988, following an $8 million renovation, the hotel joined Best Western Hotels and briefly operated as the Best Western Grosvenor, before becoming the Grosvenor Resort again. On September 1, 2007, the Grosvenor Resort was renamed the Regal Sun Resort as part of a $25 million renovation. The hotel joined Wyndham Hotels and Resorts on November 9, 2010, and became the Wyndham Lake Buena Vista.

The hotel has  of meeting space and features a fitness center and two swimming pools.

References

External links
Official Wyndham website
Hotel page on Downtown Disney Resort Area Hotels website
Hotel page on disneyworld.com website
Lake Buena Vista development history, including hotel development.

Hotels in Walt Disney World Resort
Resorts in Florida
Hotels established in 1972
1972 establishments in Florida